The Hillsdale district is a neighborhood in the southwest section of Portland, Oregon, United States.  It is centered on the Hillsdale retail and business area, a series of strip malls on SW Capitol Highway between SW Sunset Boulevard and SW Bertha Boulevard.  It is home to the Hillsdale Farmer's Market, which takes place on Sundays during the summer and every other Sunday during the winter. Hillsdale is also home to Oregon's first brewpub, with the opening of McMenamins Hillsdale Brewery in 1985.

A cornerstone of the neighborhood is the Hillsdale Library, which opened in 1957. The building closed in 2001 for remodeling, and reopened March 4, 2004. When completed, the library was named a Certified Gold LEED Building. LEED stands for Leadership in Energy and Environmental Design. It was the first LEED building in Portland. As of 2019, the Hillsdale Library is the fifth busiest branch in Multnomah County.

Hillsdale borders Southwest Hills, Healy Heights, and Homestead on the north, South Portland on the east, South Burlingame and Multnomah on the south, and Hayhurst and Bridlemile on the west.

Oregon Route 10 connects Hillsdale to Downtown Portland to the north and to Raleigh Hills and Beaverton to the west.

Hillsdale is the center of Portland's Jewish community.

Education
 Ida B. Wells-Barnett High School
 Robert Gray Middle School
 Mary Rieke Elementary School

References

External links 

 Hillsdale Street Tree Inventory Report

 
Jews and Judaism in Portland, Oregon
Neighborhoods in Portland, Oregon
Orthodox Jewish communities